Lucian Cosmin Oprea (born 31 March 1998) is a Romanian professional footballer who plays as a midfielder for CSC Dumbrăvița.

References

External links
 
 

1998 births
Living people
Romanian footballers
Association football midfielders
Liga I players
Liga II players
ACS Poli Timișoara players
FC UTA Arad players
CSC Dumbrăvița players
Sportspeople from Timișoara